Suwannaphum is a district (amphoe) of Roi Et province, in eastern Thailand. It is named after the legendary country of Suwannaphum, which according to Thai tradition was on the Chao Phraya plain. It was the seat of a small Lao mandala kingdom until the Laotian Rebellion of 1826-1829 ended vestiges of Lao independence west of the Mekong.

History
In 1718, the first Lao muang in the Chi valley—and indeed anywhere in the interior of the Khorat Plateau—was founded as Suwannaphum (in latter-day  Roi Et Province) by an official in the service of King Nokasad of the Kingdom of Champasak, leading some 3,000 subjects.

Geography
The district is in southern Roi Et Province. Neighboring districts are (from the west clockwise): Kaset Wisai, Mueang Suang, At Samat, Phanom Phrai, Nong Hi, and Moei Wadi of Roi Et Province, and Rattanaburi and Tha Tum of Surin province.

Administration
The district is divided into 15 sub-districts (tambons), which are further subdivided into 195 villages (mubans). Suwannaphum itself has township (thesaban tambon) status and covers part of tambon Sa Khu. Each of the tambons is administered by a tambon administrative organization.

References

External links
amphoe.com (Thai)

Suwannaphum